Naso mcdadei is a tropical fish found in coral reefs in the Pacific and Indian Oceans. It is commonly known as the squarenose unicornfish.

References

Naso (fish)
Fish described in 2002